The Maydays are an improvised comedy company founded in Brighton, England, in 2004 by John Cremer.

Their shows include Confessions, Tonight's Top Story, Guest Who and The Fringe Show. The Maydays are Jason Blackwater, John Cremer, Alexis Gallagher, Rebecca Macmillan, Jules Munns, Liz Peters, Jenny Rowe, Joe Samuel,  Katy Schutte, Heather Urquhart and Rhiannon Vivian.

After making a debut at the Brighton Fringe in 2004, and taking their first show to the Edinburgh Festival Fringe in 2006, the Maydays went on to win Best Comedy Show in the 2007 Brighton Fringe with their show Mayday! The Musical. Related shows have included Argus! The Musical and Evening Standard! The Musical. The company began a residency at the Komedia in 2008, and currently perform Confessions there on a monthly basis.

Since 2008, several members of the Maydays have travelled to Chicago to study Longform Improvisation at IO Theater and the Annoyance Theatre, and have since brought international tutors to the UK.

Publications

References

General references

External links
 The Maydays' Website
 Musical Improv Comedy

Improvisational troupes